Moody County is a county in the U.S. state of South Dakota, United States. The population was 6,336 at the 2020 census. Its county seat is Flandreau. The county is named for Gideon C. Moody.

Geography
Moody County lies on the east side of South Dakota. Its east boundary line abuts the west boundary line of the state of Minnesota. The Big Sioux River flows southerly through the center of the county. Its terrain consists of rolling hills, devoted to agriculture, with lakes in the western portion. The terrain slopes to the south, with its high point near its northeast corner, at 1,749' (533m) ASL, although the east and west sides also slope into the river valley through the center of the county.

Major highways

 Interstate 29
 South Dakota Highway 11
 South Dakota Highway 13
 South Dakota Highway 32
 South Dakota Highway 34

Adjacent counties

 Brookings County - north
 Lincoln County, Minnesota - northeast
 Pipestone County, Minnesota - east
 Rock County, Minnesota - southeast
 Minnehaha County - south
 Lake County - west

Lakes

 Anderson Slough
 Lake Campbell (part)
 Mud Lake
 Poison Lake
Bull Slough

Protected areas
 Anderson Slough State Game Production Area
 Boles Slough State Game Production Area
 Gideon State Game Production Area
 Hazels Haven State Game Production Area
 Kamp State Game Production Area
 Olson Lake State Game Production Area

Demographics

2000 census
As of the 2000 United States Census, there were 6,595 people, 2,526 households, and 1,763 families in the county. The population density was 13 people per square mile (5/km2). There were 2,745 housing units at an average density of 5 per square mile (2/km2). The racial makeup of the county was 84.91% White, 0.29% Black or African American, 12.01% Native American, 0.56% Asian, 0.06% from other races, and 2.17% from two or more races. 0.76% of the population were Hispanic or Latino of any race.

There were 2,526 households, out of which 35.60% had children under the age of 18 living with them, 56.70% were married couples living together, 8.50% had a female householder with no husband present, and 30.20% were non-families. 26.40% of all households were made up of individuals, and 12.20% had someone living alone who was 65 years of age or older.  The average household size was 2.58 and the average family size was 3.12.

The county population contained 29.10% under the age of 18, 7.20% from 18 to 24, 26.40% from 25 to 44, 22.30% from 45 to 64, and 14.90% who were 65 years of age or older. The median age was 37 years. For every 100 females there were 99.80 males.  For every 100 females age 18 and over, there were 97.00 males.

The median income for a household in the county was $35,467, and the median income for a family was $41,623. Males had a median income of $27,391 versus $20,472 for females. The per capita income for the county was $16,541. About 7.30% of families and 9.60% of the population were below the poverty line, including 11.40% of those under age 18 and 10.90% of those age 65 or over.

2010 census
As of the 2010 United States Census, there were 6,486 people, 2,554 households, and 1,751 families in the county. The racial makeup of the county was 81.0% white, 14.0% American Indian, 1.1% Asian, 0.5% black or African American, 0.7% from other races, and 2.7% from two or more races. Those of Hispanic or Latino origin made up 1.7% of the population. In terms of ancestry, 39.9% were German, 20.1% were Norwegian, 8.9% were Irish, 6.1% were Dutch, 5.1% were English, and 1.6% were American.

Of the 2,554 households, 30.9% had children under the age of 18 living with them, 54.3% were married couples living together, 8.8% had a female householder with no husband present, 31.4% were non-families, and 27.4% of all households were made up of individuals. The average household size was 2.48 and the average family size was 3.00. The median age was 40.5 years.

The median income for a household in the county was $52,354 and the median income for a family was $61,667. Males had a median income of $36,364 versus $30,854 for females. The per capita income for the county was $24,948. About 4.7% of families and 7.1% of the population were below the poverty line, including 8.8% of those under age 18 and 13.1% of those age 65 or over.

Communities

Cities
 Colman
 Egan
 Flandreau (county seat)

Towns
 Trent
 Ward

Census-designated place 

 Pleasant Valley Colony

Unincorporated community
 Lone Tree

Townships

 Alliance
 Blinsmon
 Clare
 Colman
 Egan
 Enterprise
 Flandreau
 Fremont
 Grovena
 Jefferson
 Lone Rock
 Lynn
 Riverview
 Spring Creek
 Union
 Ward

Politics
Moody County voters tend to split between the two major political parties. Between 1960 and 2012, the national election results in Moody County were almost always evenly split. Since 2016, the county has started supporting Republican candidates more strongly.

See also
 National Register of Historic Places listings in Moody County, South Dakota

References

External links

 

 
1873 establishments in Dakota Territory
Populated places established in 1873